María Fernanda Neil (born October 19, 1982) better known as Fernanda Neil is an Argentine actress, singer and model. As of 2013, she is no longer a public figure.

Career 
Neil made her Argentine television debut on Telefe's production 
Chiquititas she was then cast as Martina Cuenca by Alberto Fernández de Rosa. In 1999, Neil played the character of Fernanda.

In 2000, Neil played a small role, in Verano del '98.

After her participation in Chiquititas was over, Neil took a break off acting and began a career in modeling. In 2001, however, she returned to Argentine television, alongside Romina Yan, Puerto Rican singer Chayanne and Araceli González in Provócame, which was shown on English speaking countries as "Savage Attraction". Neil played Erica Villalobos Kent de Parisi in that soap opera. Provócame also became an international hit.

From 2002 to 2003, Neil was part of the cast of the youth television series Rebelde Way starring Camila Bordonaba, Luisana Lopilato, Benjamín Rojas and Felipe Colombo. Neil played Fernanda Peralta Ramos.

After acting in Rebelde Way, Neil worked in Floricienta, Doble Vida and concentrated on her modeling career.

In 2006, she played Fernanda Linares Pacheco, in the soap-apera called El Refugio. Neil, along with Francisco Bass, Piru Saez, Jorge Maggio and Belén Scalella, worked in this soap opera during one year it finished in December 2006 and had a group called Rolabogan, which was also part of the soap opera's theme. The second season of this soap opera was mentioned by Piru Saez and María Fernanda Neil would appear in it again.

After appearing in La Ley Del Amor, she appeared in Gran Hermano Famosos, the Argentine version of Celebrity Big Brother.

Filmography

Television

Theater

Television Programs

Movies

Discography

References

External links 
 

1982 births
Argentine actresses
Argentine female models
21st-century Argentine women singers
Argentine television actresses
Argentine people of British descent
Living people
Actresses from Buenos Aires
Gran Hermano (Argentine TV series) contestants